The 1984 Critérium du Dauphiné Libéré was the 36th edition of the cycle race and was held from 28 May to 4 June 1984. The race started in Villeurbanne and finished in Vals-les-Bains. The race was won by Martín Ramírez of the Colombia team.

Teams
Eleven teams, containing a total of 89 riders, participated in the race:

 
 
 
 
 
 
 
 
 
 
 Colombia team

Route

General classification

References

Further reading
 
 
 
 
 
 
 
 

1984
1984 in French sport
1984 Super Prestige Pernod International
May 1984 sports events in Europe
June 1984 sports events in Europe